Suliko is a Georgian female and male name meaning "soul". It is also the title of a love poem written in 1895 by Akaki Tsereteli, which became widely known throughout the Soviet Union as a song performed with music composed by Varinka Tsereteli (in 1895). In that form it was often performed on radio during Joseph Stalin's rule, reputedly because it was his favorite. It was translated to and performed in multiple languages including Russian, Ukrainian, Polish, Romanian, English, German, Basque, Chinese and Hebrew.

Text

Online performances 

There are many online renditions of Suliko. The following are some that demonstrate the varying performance traditions surrounding this piece:

 Mdzlevari Ensemble
 Alexandrov Ensemble
 Large Academic Chorus of Mendeleev University
 Franco Tenelli (with English subtitles)
 N.Varshanidze,Ch.Surmanidze & Ensemble Batumi
 Adi Yacobi

See also 

Nino Popiashvili, "Suliko in World Languages" (in georgian and English Languages), Tbilisi State University, 2018

Nino Popiashvili, German Translations of “Suliko”, Tbilisi State University, 2021 in: https://dspace.tsu.ge/xmlui/handle/123456789/778

Nino Popiashvili (in Georgian Language) https://1tv.ge/video/suliko-msoflios-khalkhta-enebze/

SovMusic entry for Suliko, containing the song in German and Russian

Songs of Georgia (country)
Georgian words and phrases
1895 songs